Indian Valley is an unincorporated community in Adams County, Idaho, United States. Indian Valley has a post office with ZIP code 83632.

History
Indian Valley's population was 90 in 1909, and was 30 in 1960.

References

Unincorporated communities in Adams County, Idaho
Unincorporated communities in Idaho